Christiani Pitts is an American actress, singer and dancer.

Career
Pitts began her career at age 8 in Montclair, New Jersey before moving to back to Atlanta, Georgia. In 2008 Christiani began recording her first EP. Along with love for acting and music, Christiani also pursued her career in dance and landed her first dance role in the film "Big Momma's House 3 Like Father Like Son". Christiani attended the Florida State University in the prestigious Musical Theatre Program. In 2018 she was cast as Ann Darrow in "King Kong" on Broadway.

Filmography 
 Big Mommas: Like Father, Like Son - Diva #2
 Elementary - Allison (Episode: Nobody Lives Forever)
 Evil - Annie Commerce (Episode: 2 Fathers)
 The Good Fight - Melanie Evers (Episode: The Gang Offends Everyone)
Live with Kelly and Ryan - Herself (Season: 31 Episode: 180)
 Resort to Love - Beverly Strattford

Theatre

References

External links 
 
 
 
 
 
 Christiani Pitts at Broadway.com

Living people
1993 births
American actresses
African-American actresses
21st-century African-American people
21st-century African-American women